The following is a list of properties managed by The Trustees of Reservations (TTOR), a non-profit land conservation and historic preservation organization dedicated to preserving natural and historical places in the Commonwealth of Massachusetts. The Trustees are the oldest regional land trust in the world. Properties include historic mansions, estates, and gardens; woodland preserves; waterfalls; mountain peaks; wetlands and riverways; coastal bluffs, beaches, and barrier islands; farmland and CSA projects; and archaeological sites.

* Property is managed, not owned, by TTOR.

Property guidebook

Members may receive a copy of The Trustees' own Property Guide.

References